Ali's Eight Days is a 2009 Turkish drama film, written and directed by Cemal Şan, starring Serdar Orçin as a young shop owner who falls in love with a woman escaping from an abusive relationship. It is the final part of a trilogy of films which includes Zeynep's Eight Days (2007) and Dilber's Eight Days (2008).

Production
The film was shot on location in Istanbul, Turkey.

References

External links
 

2000s Turkish-language films
2009 drama films
2009 films
Films set in Turkey
Turkish drama films